Chaudhary Charan Singh International Airport metro station is located on the North-South Corridor of the Lucknow Metro providing connectivity with the Chaudhary Charan Singh International Airport to the other parts of the city. It was opened on 8 March 2019. This metro station serves as the northern terminus station for the Red Line of Lucknow Metro.

It is located at the front of the T2 terminal of Lucknow International Airport.

Station layout

References

Lucknow Metro stations
Memorials to Chaudhary Charan Singh
Airport railway stations in India

